Micrurapteryx tibetiensis is a moth of the family Gracillariidae. It is known from China (Tibet).

References

Moths described in 2013
Gracillariinae